Janeth Magufuli (born 1960) is a Tanzanian educator and former First Lady of Tanzania. She was married to Tanzanian President John Magufuli and served as the country's First Lady from the November 2015 election until her husband's death in March 2021.

Magufuli originally worked as a primary school teacher for more than twenty years.

References

1960 births
First Ladies of Tanzania
Living people
Tanzanian educators
Place of birth missing (living people)
John Magufuli
Tanzanian Roman Catholics